Austin Wai Tin-chi (13 August 1957 – 4 October 2012) was a Hong Kong actor and choreographer. He was the elder brother of actress Kara Wai. He had notable roles in the martial arts films like The 36th Chamber of Shaolin, 5 Superfighters, The Avenging Eagle and Flash Point.

Filmography

Film

Pi li quan (1972) - Young Tien Wa
Si da men pai (1977)
Yin yang xie di zi (1977)
Huang fei hong si da di zi (1977)
Gong fu xiao zi (1977)
The 36th Chamber of Shaolin (1978) - Shaolin disciple
Nan yang tang ren jie (1978)
Shi zi mo hou shou (1978)
The Avenging Eagle (1978) - Cao Gao-shing
Qian Long xia Yangzhou (1978)
Yi tian tu long ji da jie ju (1978)
Xing mu zi gu huo zhao (1979)
Yuan yue wan dao (1979) - Knight
Da chu tou (1979)
The Deadly Breaking Sword (1979)
Lao shu la gui (1979)
Xin tie cuo men shen (1979)
5 Superfighters (1979) - Wang Fu-chung
Qi sha (1979)
Cha chi nan fei (1980) - Hsiao Tang
Ying xiong wu lei (1980)
Jin hu men (1980)
Hong fen dong jiang hu (1981)
Bong ju (1982) - Fu Chung-Yuan
 Demi-Gods and Semi-Devils (film) (1982) - Muk-yung Fuk
Long teng hu yue (1983) - Ah Tung
Zhi zhuan yi jian (1984) - Chin's 2nd challenger
Zui hou yi zhan (1987) - Sum Ying-Mo
Long zhi zheng ba (1989) - Chau Chi-Chung
Zhuo gui da shi (1989) - Cheung's Ancestor
Qian nu yun yu qing (1989)
Zhuang zhi hao qing (1990)
Fu gui bing tuan (1990) - Little Tortoise
Hei dao huo hu li (1990)
Lie xue jie tou (1991)
Cao mang ying ci (1992)
Shen qiang shou yu Ka li ji (1992) - Wu Yuen-Shin
Chi yu qing hua (1992)
Shui hu zhuan zhi ying xiong ben se (1993) - Opposition Commander
Yan yuk lap cheung (1993)
The Secret File (1993)
Da mo zu shi (1994) - Prince
Bao yu jiao yang (1994) - Brother Four
Mo yu zhui kong (1994) - Cheung Ming
The Blade (1995) - Master of Sharp Manufacturers
Sing yuet tung wa (1999) - Officer Ko
Hak do fung wan ji sau chuk wong (1999)
You sha cuo mao ai cuo (1999) - Au Fung
Yi dai xiao xiong cao cao (1999)
Sang sei kuen chuk (2000)
Wong Gok hak yeh (2004) - Milo's Superior
Kill Zone (2005) - Cheung Chun Fei
Flash Point (2007) - Four Eyes
Zang li zha (FIT) ren (2007)
Rebellion (2009) - Mr. Tai
Gong fu yong chun (2010) - (final film role)

Television dramas
She diao ying xiong zhuan (1983) - Luk Kwun-ying
Lui Sei Leung (1985)
Tian Long Ba Bu (1991) - Qiao Feng/Xiao Feng

References

External links

1957 births
2012 deaths
Male actors from Shandong
Shaw Brothers Studio
Chinese male film actors
Chinese male television actors
Hong Kong male film actors
Hong Kong male television actors
20th-century Chinese male actors
20th-century Hong Kong male actors
21st-century Chinese male actors
21st-century Hong Kong male actors
Hong Kong kung fu practitioners
Sportspeople from Shandong
Manchu male actors
Hong Kong people of Manchu descent